Kiltsi is a village in Ridala Parish, Lääne County, in western Estonia. It is situated southwest to the town of Haapsalu, harbour village Rohuküla is located west to Kiltsi.

Haapsalu Airfield (ICAO: EEHU) is located in Kiltsi.

Gallery

References

Villages in Lääne County